Nabor Castillo Pérez (born 4 October 1990 in Pachuca, Hidalgo) is a judoka from Mexico.

After winning gold in Pan American Judo Championships he said that before championships he had hoped to win a medal but did not know what color it would be. His primary intention when entering was to gain points to qualify for the 2012 Summer Olympics.  He did so, and reached the third round in London, beating Khom Ratanakmony before losing to Elio Verde.

Castillo was the first Mexican judoka to win a medal at a World Judo Grand Prix event.

Achievements

References

External links
 
 

Mexican male judoka
1990 births
Living people
Judoka at the 2011 Pan American Games
Judoka at the 2012 Summer Olympics
Olympic judoka of Mexico
Pan American Games medalists in judo
Pan American Games silver medalists for Mexico
Medalists at the 2011 Pan American Games